Vice-Admiral Alfred Francis Blakeney Carpenter, VC (17 September 1881 – 27 December 1955) was a Royal Navy officer who was selected by his fellow officers and men to receive the Victoria Cross, the highest and most prestigious award for gallantry in the face of the enemy that can be awarded to British and Commonwealth forces.

Family
Carpenter was born in Barnes, the son of Henrietta Maud née Shadwell (1858-1889) and Captain Alfred Carpenter RN, and grandson of Commander Charles Carpenter. He attended Bedales School founded by his Uncle Edward Carpenter's close friend John Haden Badley. In 1903 married to Emily Maud Mary Tordiffe (1881-1923) and after her death married Hilda Margaret Allison née Smith (1891-1958) in 1927.

Career
Carpenter joined the Royal Navy and saw naval service as a midshipman in Crete in 1898 and during the Boxer Rebellion of 1900–01. He was acting sub-lieutenant from 15 May 1901. In August 1902 he was temporarily posted to the torpedo boat destroyer HMS Havock for service during the Coronation Fleet review. From late October that year he was posted to the corvette HMS Cleopatra, used as a training cruiser in home waters, and confirmed in the rank of sub-lieutenant. He specialised in navigation from 1903 and received the thanks of the Admiralty for several inventions, and a Humane Society medal for saving life at sea. During World War I he served on Admiral Jellicoe's staff 1914–15. He was promoted to Commander in 1915 and served as navigating officer of HMS Emperor of India 1915–17.

On 22/23 April 1918, Captain Carpenter was in command of HMS Vindictive which was to land a force of 200 Royal Marines on the mole at Zeebrugge at the start of the Zeebrugge Raid. For his conduct during this action he was awarded the VC:

(Rule 13 of the Royal Warrant provides that after an action in which all are equally brave and distinguished, where no special selection can be made, the officer in overall command may direct that one officer may be selected for the award by the officers and men who took part in the action.)

Carpenter was also made an Officer of the Legion of Honour and awarded the Croix de Guerre with palm. He was sent on a lecturing tour through the US and Canada, 1918–19.

After the war, Carpenter was in command of HMS Carysfort in the Atlantic Fleet 1921–23, Captain of Chatham Dockyard 1924–26, in command of HMS Benbow in 1926 and of HMS Marlborough 1927–28. He was a naval aide-de-camp to the King (an honorary position) in 1929, and promoted rear-admiral and placed on the retired list in the same year. He was promoted to vice-admiral (retired) in 1934. During World War II he commanded the Wye Valley section of the Gloucestershire Home Guard.

His Victoria Cross is displayed at the Imperial War Museum, London, England.

Publications
The blocking of Zeebrugge, Herbert Jenkins, London, 1925, translated into French as L'embouteillage de Zeebrugge, Payot, Paris, 1924
De Raid op Zeebrugge door Carl Decaluwé en Tomas Termoteis (gebaseerd op 80 glasplaten van de kapitein van de Vindictive, Captain Alfred Carpenter, die in WO I de aanval op Zeebrugge leidde), ROULARTA MEDIA GROUP, 15 April 2015

References
CARPENTER, Vice-Admiral Alfred Francis Blakeney, Who Was Who, A & C Black, 1920–2008; online edn, Oxford University Press, Dec 2007
Obituary – Vice-Adm. A.F. Carpenter – The Zeebrugge Raid, The Times, London, 28 December 1955, page 11

Monuments to Courage (David Harvey, 1999)
The Register of the Victoria Cross (This England, 1997)
VCs of the First World War - The Naval VCs (Stephen Snelling, 2002)

External links
 

Location of grave and VC medal (Gloucestershire)

1881 births
1955 deaths
People from Barnes, London
People educated at Bedales School
Officiers of the Légion d'honneur
Royal Navy vice admirals
Military personnel from Surrey
British World War I recipients of the Victoria Cross
Royal Navy recipients of the Victoria Cross
Recipients of the Croix de Guerre 1914–1918 (France)
Royal Navy personnel of the Boxer Rebellion
Royal Navy officers of World War I
British Home Guard officers
Deputy Lieutenants of Gloucestershire
British military personnel of the 1898 Occupation of Crete
19th-century Royal Navy personnel